A club chair is a type of armchair, usually covered in leather. It was created and made in France.

The craftsmen involved in the design of the chair were unknown. The origins of the term "club" are unclear, but it may be a reference to the gentlemen's club.

Characteristics

Shape 

While the club chair is undoubtedly a classic feature of interior decor in France, it remains just as relevant as ever today. As time has passed, the chair's charm, diversity and fame have grown.

With great simplicity, the Art Deco era produced armchairs with clean, flexible lines, in contrast to the Art Nouveau style of the 1910s.

After the Second World War, dozens of different shapes appeared. Some have stood the test of time, such as the "moustache" and the "gendarme’s hat", named after the shape of the backrest. 
The round shape has become the club armchair's most emblematic incarnation.

Manufacture

Design, carpentry, fellmongery, upholstery and colouring are the main crafts involved in the manufacture of a club armchair. Each chair is a product of all this combined expertise.

The club armchair first appeared at the start of the 20th century, with the application of a new padding technique, using double conical springs not only in the seat cushion but also in the backrest and armrests. Coir filling supplemented the suppleness of these springs.

Industrial progress led to the replacement of this padding method with no-sag springs or elastic webbing, together with synthetic foam.

Covering 

Coverings have changed as industrial techniques have developed, and have included Mercerised cotton, velvet, calfskin and, most recently, bicast leather. However, sheep's leather is still considered the authentic material for the chairs.

With a vegetable-tanned sheep's leather covering, the marks and defects in the skin are visible through the dye, making each chair unique. Furthermore, the particularly fine grain gives the armchair a unique patina over time. French leather was renowned for its quality in the 19th century.

Between six and eight skins of approximately  each are required to cover an armchair. They are applied wet, stretched as tightly as possible, and contract as they dry. They will last around 40 years.

Chairs